Since its inception in 1979, The Football Conference has formed the fifth-highest level of the overall English Football League System.

The 2003–04 Football Conference season was the 25th season of the Football Conference and the last consisting of a single division. The top team and the winner of the play-offs were promoted to Football League Two, while this season only one team was relegated.

A total of 22 teams contest the division, including 17 sides from last season, two relegated from the Football League Two and winners of Northern Premier League, Southern Football League and Isthmian League.

Promotion and relegation

Teams promoted from Northern Premier League
 Accrington Stanley

Teams promoted from Southern Football League
 Tamworth

Teams promoted from Isthmian League
 Aldershot Town

Teams relegated from Third Division
 Exeter City
 Shrewsbury Town

Overview
All teams participating were professional, except for Aldershot Town, who were part-timers. In fact, Aldershot's performance exceeded everyone's expectations.

Chester City clinched the league title and won promotion to Football League Two.

Shrewsbury Town also earned promotion to League Two following their 3–0 play-off win on penalties after a 1–1 draw with Aldershot Town.

No clubs were relegated on the basis of their performances, due to Margate being demoted, Telford folding and the winners and runners-up of the Unibond League not meeting the criteria for a place in the Football Conference.

Shrewsbury Town had the highest attendance, 84,150 in all, with an average of 4,007. Margate and Leigh RMI had the least spectators with 11,905 and 11,881, respectively, with an average of 567 and 566, respectively.

The total number of attendance was 880,220, yielding an average of 1905 per game, which was the all-time record for the Football Conference.

The regular season began on 9 August 2003, and ended on 24 April 2004.

Final league table

Locations

Results

Play-offs

The Conference National play-offs determined the second team that would be promoted to Football League Two. The teams placed second through fifth qualified for the play-offs. The semi-finals were played in a two-leg, home and away format, while the final was played as one leg.

Top scorers in order of league goals

Source:

References

External links
 Official Football Conference website

 
National League (English football) seasons
5
English